Georg Schmidt (7 April 1927 – 6 July 1990) was an Austrian football (soccer) former manager.

Most notably he was co-manager of the Austria national football team in the 1982 FIFA World Cup, with Felix Latzke, and was thus credited with infamy for the Shame of Gijón, a somewhat dubious 0-1 loss to West Germany.

References

External links

1927 births
1990 deaths
Austrian football managers
1982 FIFA World Cup managers
Austria national football team managers